Ray Kennedy (born May 13, 1954) is an American country music artist. He has recorded two albums for Atlantic Records. His two albums produced four singles that appeared on the Hot Country Songs charts; 1990's "What a Way to Go" was his only top 40 country hit and peaked at No.10.

Born in Buffalo, New York, Kennedy won a Grammy Award in 2005 in the Best Contemporary Folk Album category for producing Steve Earle's album The Revolution Starts Now. He has produced many recordings with Earle which are collectively known as The Twangtrust.

Ray's father is Ray Kennedy, Sr. Ray Kennedy Sr. was a credit manager for Sears; he had the idea to create the Discover Card which was launched in 1985. Ray Kennedy Jr. is married to Siobhan Maher Kennedy.

Discography

Albums

Singles

Music videos

As a producer
Dream Number 29 by Cindy Bullens (2005)

References

External links
[ AllMusic Biography]

1954 births
American country singer-songwriters
American male singer-songwriters
Musicians from Buffalo, New York
Grammy Award winners
Living people
Singer-songwriters from New York (state)
Atlantic Records artists
American country record producers
Country musicians from New York (state)
Record producers from New York (state)